Anchal may be either a surname or given name
Rajiv Anchal (b. India), film producer and director
Anchal Joseph (b. 1987 India), Indian-American model
Anchal Sabharwal (b. 29 August 1986),a film actress and model
Anchal Achan (b. 1770-80), a saint of Anchal
Anchal Sonkar (b. 1960), an Indian politician

Indian names